The Royal Launceston Show is an annual event held in Carrick in October and is hosted by the Royal National Agricultural and Pastoral Society of Tasmania (RNAPS), established in 1873. The show marks a public holiday that is observed in northern Tasmania only.

The Royal Launceston Show is principally an agricultural event which focuses on the primary industries of Tasmania, and rural lifestyle of many Tasmanians with events such as livestock judging, equestrian events, animal breeders competitions, produce competitions and wood chopping, although it also incorporates live entertainment, sporting events and more. A popular feature of the show is the sideshow area featuring showrides, foodstalls, games of skill, and showbag stalls.

Like its southern counterpart, the Royal Hobart Show, over recent years the event has shifted towards more of a carnival atmosphere than its previously more agrarian focus. From 2018, the show became a one day event on Thursday 11 October, a public holiday in the north of the state, known as Show Day.

In 2020 the Show, due on 21 to 24 October, was cancelled due to restrictions related to the COVID-19 pandemic. Other cancellations happened from 1915 to 1918 & 1940 to 1944.

In 2022 the show will move out of Launceston to Carrick. It is scheduled for 6–8 October 2022 and will last three days. 2021 saw the show ended up being cancelled again.

References

External links
Royal National Agricultural and Pastoral Society of Tasmania Limited (RNAPS)
Royal Agricultural Society of Tasmania

Launceston
Festivals in Tasmania
Spring (season) events in Australia
Launceston, Tasmania